Phatichar (translation: poor, wearing tattered clothes) is an Indian television series on Doordarshan in 1991, starring Pankaj Kapur in the title role. His character lived in a cement pipe and the show portrayed, in a bitter-sweet manner, the life of the disadvantaged living on the margins.

This is a black humor telecasted as TV series in Doordarshan, written and directed by Anil Chaudhary. Sharang Dev was the music director. The catch phrase of the show was "Arre yaar phatichar, tu itna emotional kyun hain?"

Plot 
Writer Ajit Vachhani (Character has the same name of the actor) gets a project from the renowned publisher Paul to write his biography. But before he could finish the writing the character runs away from the unfinished novel. The character got the name "Phatichar" given by a bell boy in a hotel. By accident Phatichar gets involved with a poor family of a blind sister, a dwarf brother and their drunkard uncle. He started living in a water pipe of municipality. While living with this family he becomes familiar with harsh reality of the common man's life. He becomes concerned and worried about this despondency of poor people. He tries to solve these in his candid but comical way.

Cast and crew

Cast 
 Pankaj Kapoor as Phatichar
 Ajit Vachhani as Writer Ajit Vachhani
 Nina Gupta as Sapna
 Avtar Gill as Banke
 Preeti Khare as Mala
 Rajesh Puri as chacha
 Anupam Kher in a cameo role

Crew 
 Writer and Director: Anil Chaudhary
 Cinematographer: Sunil Sharma
 Music Director: Sharang Dev
 Producer: Indu Prakash
 Editor: Gajendra Singh

References 

DD National original programming
1991 Indian television series debuts